Donald Hudson 'Don' Frew is a figure in American Wicca, the Covenant of the Goddess, national and global interfaith dialogue, and Pagan studies.

He is a National Interfaith Representative for the Covenant of the Goddess. He has been representing Wicca ("the Craft") in interfaith work since 1985 and has served on the Executive Committee of the Berkeley Area Interfaith Council, on the board of directors of the Interfaith Center at the Presidio, in the Assembly of the World's Religious & Spiritual Leaders at of the Parliament of the World's Religions, and on the Global Council of the United Religions Initiative. He is the founder & Director of the Lost & Endangered Religions Project, focused on preserving and restoring the religious traditions of marginal communities. Frew has broached regular cooperation with law enforcement agencies and skeptics organizations, confronting the "Satanic Panic" of the 1990s.

Wicca and the Covenant of the Goddess 
Frew's interest in Wicca began at age 12 in a group mentored by nearby Witch Lilith St. John. In 1983 Frew was initiated into Coven Firestar, a NROOGD (New Reformed Order of the Golden Dawn) coven and later into a Gardnerian coven (Tobar Bhride) in 1985. He is an Elder in both the NROOGD and Gardnerian Traditions of Neopagan witchcraft or Wicca. He is High Priest of a Gardnerian coven in Berkeley, California – Coven Trismegiston – with his wife Anna Korn.

Frew's covens have been members in the Covenant of the Goddess (or "CoG", the world's largest religious organization for Witches), and in 1985 he was elected CoG's second Public Information Officer. He has, since then, served nine terms on CoG's National Board.
Frew's work as Public Information Officer for CoG led him into communication and collaboration with parts of society traditionally in tension with the Craft community: law enforcement, conservative Evangelical Christianity, and the then-nascent interfaith movement.

Frew and his wife wrote a revision of the Gardnerian Book of Shadows, annotating the basic text to multiple books of shadows from different parts of the US and UK to Gardner's and Valiente's book of shadows, and to many other historic documents.

Work with law enforcement 
Since 1985 Frew has worked with San Francisco police Inspector Sandi Gallant as a consultant on the occult, growing over the years to collaboration with law enforcement agencies around the country. Frew served as an occult expert / consultant on the McMartin Preschool Trial, the Leonard Lake serial killings, and the Matamoros murders, among others.

In 1986, with his college friend Shawn Carlson, Frew proposed that the Committee for the Scientific Examination of Religion (CSER) investigate the rising and widespread claims of "Satanic Ritual Abuse" or "SRA." A two-year investigation followed, by members of CSER, Robert Hicks of the Justice Department, and Ken Lanning of the FBI, with Frew, Carlson, and others. The results were published in as "Satanism in America: How the Devil Got Much More than his Due". This report, finding no evidence of organized criminal activity by Satanist groups, turned the tide of law enforcement opinion against claims of widespread criminal activity by Satanic cults.

Work with evangelical Christians 
In 1986, Frew approached and began a dialogue with the Spiritual Counterfeits Project, a Berkeley-based Evangelical Christian research organization focused against cults and the occult. Frew and SCP founder Brooks Alexander organized a ground-breaking series of ten four-hour dialogues on topics of interest to both Christians and Witches, between members of the SCP and members of the Covenant of the Goddess. Frew and Alexander have remained friends and advocates for dialogue between Witches and Christians. Frew contributed to Alexander's book Witchcraft Goes Mainstream in 2004.

To pursue the belief that interfaith groups need to communicate even with the most conservative elements of Christianity and Islam, Frew also reached out to and developed a working relationship with Lee Penn, the most vocal detractor of the United Religions Initiative and author of False Dawn: The United Religions Initiative, Globalism, and the Quest for a One-World Religion. Frew is one of the most often cited sources in Penn's book.

Interfaith work 
Frew has worked to obtain recognition of Pagan and Indigenous peoples as members of interfaith councils. As a Wiccan, Frew joined the Berkeley Area Interfaith Council (BAIC) in 1985, and was elected to its Executive Committee in 1986. In 1987 he was appointed Executive Secretary, becoming the first Witch to serve as an officer on the Board of a local interfaith council in the United States. BAIC was a member of the North American Interfaith Network (NAIN), an association of interfaith councils of Canada and the US, and during Frew's term the Covenant of the Goddess became the first Pagan organization listed in NAIN's Directory.

Through Frew's efforts, in 1992 the Covenant of the Goddess became one of four Neopagan organizations to co-sponsor the 1993 Parliament of the World's Religions, where over 8000 international attendees attended over 900 programs in the course of nine days. Frew was one of four Neopagans selected to give a "Major Presentation" titled "Pagans in Interfaith Dialogue" By the end of the nine days, the academics attending the Parliament were saying "In 1893, America was introduced to the Buddhists and Hindus; in 1993, we met the Neopagans." One media person described the Parliament as "the coming-out party for the Neopagans."

In 1995 both the United Nations and the Berkeley Area Interfaith Council celebrated their 50th anniversaries. Frew and other interfaith organizers in Berkeley created the "Celebrating the Spirit" conference, an official UN50 event that continued discussions concerning the "Global Ethic" document that had been signed at the Assembly at the 1993 Parliament.

Frew has continued to represent CoG at all of the subsequent Parliaments—Cape Town 1999, Barcelona 2004, Melbourne 2009—and be active in key events. In 1997 Frew became one of only three Pagan representatives in the Parliament's "Assembly of the World's Religious and Spiritual Leaders".

At the 1999 Parliament in Cape Town, South Africa:
• Frew presented on Wicca.

• He accepted invitation by Dr. Gerald O. Barney, author of the Global 2000 Report, to be part of a panel of religious leaders addressing his "Millennium Questions" asking representatives of different faiths to respond to the crises of the age.

• As part of the Parliament, Frew created the Lost & Endangered Religions Project and (LERP), an interfaith nonprofit service organization that works with marginalized religious communities to preserve religious traditions in danger of being lost forever., at LERP was one of five "Gifts of Service" created at this Parliament's Assembly selected to be presented to the Dalai Lama.

At the 2004 Parliament of the World's Religions in Barcelona, Spain, Frew presented on the ongoing work of the Lost & Endangered Religions Project and on the Interfaith Sacred Space Design Competition (see below), coordinated an exhibit of designs from the Competition, participated in the Parliament Assembly (working specifically on access to clean water), and assisted with programming put on by the United Religions Initiative.

Frew again presented on the Lost & Endangered Religions Project and on the United Religions Initiative at the 2009 Parliament of the World's Religions in Melbourne, Australia. He also facilitated a panel of Australian Pagans and was interviewed by Patheos.com.

In 1998 and 1999, Frew represented CoG (with Deborah Ann Light) at the Global Summits held at Stanford University to create the Charter for a new interfaith organization – the United Religions Initiative. In 2000 he attended its charter signing ceremony in Pittsburgh PA. In 2002 he was elected to the URI's first Global Council (Board of Trustees), becoming the first Neopagan to serve on the board of a global interfaith organization. The United Religions Initiative has grown to be the largest grassroots interfaith organization on Earth, involving over 2.5 million people involved in over 650 Cooperation Circles in 86 countries and Frew has stayed closely involved. He was appointed an At-Large trustee in both the second and third terms of the URI's Global Council, and a Continuing Trustee in its fourth term.

Frew helped found many URI Cooperation Circles, including the Spirituality & the Earth CC (S&ECC) which he coordinates. It has been hosting annual "People of the Earth", conferences at the Interfaith Center at the Presidio since 2008; has arranged for English lessons, computer training, and video training for Latin American indigenous representatives involved in interfaith work, and maintains a website to assist with their networking efforts. With the Expressing the URI in Music & the Arts CC (EURIMA) Frew helped create One World, Many Voices, one of the first interfaith songbooks; the first Interfaith Sacred Space Design Competition resulting in 160 designs submitted from teams in 17 countries and edited the final book, Sacred Spaces .
In 2000 Frew was appointed to the board of directors of the Interfaith Center at the Presidio (ICP), becoming the first Neopagan to serve on the board of a regional interfaith organization. The ICP is a consortium of over a dozen interfaith councils, seminaries, and interfaith organizations in the San Francisco Bay Area that work together to maintain a permanent site for ongoing interfaith work in the Presidio's Main Base Chapel.

Research on origins of Wicca 
Frew is a leading proponent arguing that modern Wicca stretches back to the paganism of Classical Antiquity. Frew finds a genuine antiquity to core cosmological concepts and liturgical elements in Gardnerian Craft. His work focuses on parallels between Gardnerian Wicca and the theurgy of the later Neoplatonists. While the definitive text is in production, he has presented talks and papers on this subject in a number of Pagan venues, including:

"Crafting the Art of Magic: A Critical Review", serialized in The Hidden Path and other journals, also available online
"Gardner & Crowley: the Overstated Connection", PantheaCon 1996
"Ye Bok of ye Art Magical: A presentation of pages from this early Craft document", PantheaCon 1997, revised & updated 1998
"Methodological Problems in Recent Studies of Historical and Modern Witchcraft", PantheaCon 1998
"Little-known Mystery Sites of Europe and the Near East: a slide presentation", PantheaCon 1998
"Harran: Last Refuge of Classical Paganism", PantheaCon 1999
"Selected Topics in the History of Wica: including Why 'Wica' with one 'c'?; Who was the Crotona Fellowship?; The History of the Book of Shadows; The Truth about Gardner's Ph.D.; The Origins of the Charge of the Goddess; The Origins of the Wheel of the Yea; Idries Shah, Gerald Gardner, and Robert Graves; Sallustius' 'On the Gods': a primer of Wican Theology?", PantheaCon 2001
"Gardner, Crowley, and witchcraft: A Presentation and Discussion of the Evidence" – revised & updated, PantheaCon 2003
"Paganism & Islam: The Legacy of Harran", PantheaCon 2004
"Hekate in Turkey: Past meets Present", PantheaCon 2006
"Recent Discoveries in Pagan Mesopotamia", PantheaCon 2006
"Images of Our History: Early Gardnerian Texts & What They Tell Us", PantheaCon 2007
"Göbekli Tepe: The World's First Pagan Temple", PantheaCon 2009
"What is Neoplatonism & Why Should I Care?", PantheaCon 2010
"Gardnerian Wica as Theurgic Ascent", TheurgiCon 2010

Publications 
Shawn Carlson, Gerald A. Larue, et al., Satanism in America: How the Devil Got Much More than his Due, CSER, Buffalo NY, 1989
Gus diZerega, Don Frew, and Ken Wilber, "Neopaganism and the Mystical Tradition", published online at Neopaganism and the Mystical Tradition
Donald H. Frew, "Crafting the Art of Magic: A Critical Review", serialized in several magazines, including The Hidden Path, Shadowplay (Australia), and The Merrymount Messenger, 1991, available online at 
Frew, "Pagans in Interfaith Dialogue", a talk given at the Parliament of the World's Religions, Chicago, 1993, available online at Pagans in Interfaith Dialogue
Frew, "Anti-Semitism in Star Trek", Crank #6, New York NY, 1997, pp 14 – 16
"Methodological Flaws in Recent Studies of Historical and Modern Witchcraft", Ethnologies, Vol. 20 #1, The Folklore Studies Association of Canada, Quebec, 1998, available online at 2011 Introduction to Key Frew Article
Frew, ed., Sacred Spaces, Interfaith Center at the Presidio, San Francisco CA, 2004
Frew, "Gardnerian Wica as Theurgic Ascent", TheurgiCon, 2010, available online at 
Philip Johnson & Gus diZerega, Beyond the Burning Times, (Introduction & Response by Frew), Lion UK, Oxford, 2008

References 

1960 births
Living people
American Wiccans
Writers from the San Francisco Bay Area
Religious leaders from the San Francisco Bay Area
Wiccan writers